Oxyurichthys rapa is a species of goby found in the Eastern Pacific: Rapa (French Polynesia).

References

rapa
Fish of the Pacific Ocean
Taxa named by Frank Lorenzo Pezold III
Taxa named by Helen K. Larson
Fish described in 2015